D. citri may refer to:
 Diaporthe citri, a plant pathogen
 Diaphorina citri, the Asian citrus psyllid, a sap-sucking hemipteran bug species

See also